Lomographa perapicata is a moth in the family Geometridae. It is found in Taiwan and China.

References

Moths described in 1924
Lomographa
Moths of Asia
Moths of Taiwan